Tingena nycteris is a species of moth in the family Oecophoridae. It is endemic to New Zealand and has been observed in the North and South Islands. This species inhabits native forest and scrubland and adults are on the wing from October to January.

Taxonomy
This species was described by Edward Meyrick in 1890 using specimens collected by George Hudson in Wellington in November and named Oecophora nycteris. In 1915 Meyrick discussed this species under the name Borkhausenia nycteris. In 1926 Alfred Philpott discussed and illustrated the genitalia of the male of this species. In 1928 George Hudson also discussed and illustrated this species in his book The butterflies and moths of New Zealand. In 1988 J. S. Dugdale placed this species within the genus Tingena. The male lectotype is held at the Natural History Museum, London.

Description

Meyrick described this species as follows:
Hudson pointed out that this species is considerably variable and suggested that the North Island form of this species may possibly be a distinct species. Hudson states that the males of this species are paler and smaller in the North Island in comparison to the males found in the South Island. The female also varies in colour sometimes dark brown like the male others are paler with variegated colour.

Distribution
This species is endemic to New Zealand and has been observed in Wellington, Otira River, Wyndham, Riverton, Dunedin and Invercargill.

Behaviour 
The adults of this species are on the wing from October to January.

Habitat 
This species inhabits open native forest and scrubland.

Enemies 

The larvae of T. nycteris play host to the parasitic fly Fustiserphus intrudens.

References

Oecophoridae
Moths of New Zealand
Moths described in 1890
Endemic fauna of New Zealand
Taxa named by Edward Meyrick
Endemic moths of New Zealand